Denis Jean Achille Luchaire (October 24, 1846November 14, 1908) was a  French historian.

Biography
Luchaire was born in Paris. In 1879 he became a professor at Bordeaux and in 1889 professor of mediaeval history at the Sorbonne; in 1895 he became a member of the Académie des sciences morales et politiques, where he obtained the Jean Reynaud prize just before his death.

His grandnephew was the French collaborationist Jean Luchaire, during World War II.

Works
The most important of Achille Luchaire's earlier works is his Histoire des institutions monarchiques de la France sous les premiers Capétiens (1883 and again 1891); he also wrote:
Manuel des institutions françaises: période des Capétiens directs (1892)
Louis VI le Gros, annales de sa vie et de son règne (1890)
Étude sur les actes de Louis VII (1885).
His later writings deal mainly with the history of the papacy, and took the form of an elaborate work on Pope Innocent III. This is divided into six parts:
Rome et Italie (1904)
La Croisade des Albigeois (1905)
La Papauté et l'Empire (1905)
La Question d'Orient (1906)
Les Royautés vassales du Saint-Siège (1908)
Le Concile de Latran et la réforme de l'Église (1908)
He wrote two of the earlier volumes of Ernest Lavisse's Histoire de France.

Assessment
Kirby Page writes in  Jesus or Christianity (1929):

References

External links
 
 
 Text of Études sur les idiomes pyrénéens de la région française (1879) (in French) at Archive.org

1846 births
1908 deaths
Academic staff of the University of Paris
19th-century French historians
French medievalists
Members of the Académie des sciences morales et politiques
French male non-fiction writers
20th-century French historians